Armando Varela (born 1 March 1997) is an East Timorese professional footballer who plays as a midfielder for Kablaky FC and Timor-Leste national football team.

International career
Armando made his senior international debut in an 8-0 loss against United Arab Emirates national football team in the 2018 FIFA World Cup qualification on 12 November 2015.

References

External links
 

Living people
1997 births
Association football midfielders
East Timorese footballers
Timor-Leste international footballers